Hardwicke's rat snake (Platyceps ventromaculatus), also known commonly as the glossy-bellied racer, Gray's rat snake, and the spotted bellied snake, is a species of snake in the family Colubridae. The species is native to Asia. There are three recognized subspecies.

Geographic range
P. ventromaculatus is found in southwestern Asia from northern India to southern Turkey, Pakistan, Afghanistan (Leviton 1959: 461), Uzbekistan, Iraq, Iran, Jordan (Disi 1993), Kuwait, Bahrain, Saudi Arabia (along the Arabian Sea) to Israel.

It has been recorded in South Asia from Chitral in the north to Almora in Kumaon, Uttarakhand state, south to the Khandesh area in Maharashtra.

Status
P. ventromaculatus is not uncommon.

Description
P. ventromaculatus is a graceful snake with a smooth, round, elongate, gradually tapering body, and a tail more than one-fourth the total length. It has a moderately narrow head. It varies in colour and can be grey, olive-brown, olive-green, or dirty yellow. It has a series of black rhomboidal cross-bars running down the middle of the back. The scales forming the cross-bars normally have colour on the edges only. The sides of the body have similar smaller spots alternating with interspaces which may be broader or narrower than them. The belly is yellow to white with glossy scales.

The head is of the body-colour with or without symmetrical darkish markings. These may consist of:
A blackish spot between the lores. 
A black streak obliquely placed below the eye. 
A black stripe from the temporal area to the gape.
A cross-bar and two stripes on the nape.

Size

Identifying characteristics
Dorsal scales in 19:19:15 or 13 rows.
Anal divided.
Supralabials (upper lip scales).
The 4th, 5th and 6th touch the eye. The 4th and 9th are divided. 
In some rare cases, the 3rd and 8th may be divided in some case, with the 3rd, 4th and 5th touching the eye.
The nostril occupies two-thirds of the suture between the nostrils.
The tail is more than one-fourth the total length.

Subspecies
The following three subspecies are recognized as being valid, including the nominotypical subspecies.
Platyceps ventromaculatus bengalensis  – India; Type locality: Bengal, description from Plate 80, figure 1 of Gray 1830–35; holotype destroyed.
Platyceps ventromaculatus indusai  – Pakistan; Type locality: Upper and lower Indus Valley.
Platyceps ventromaculatus ventromaculatus 

Nota bene: A trinomial authority in parentheses indicates that the subspecies was originally described in a genus other than Platyceps.

Habitat
P. ventromaculatus inhabits mainly stony hillsides, open or cultivated land, and sometimes congested urban areas. It has been recorded in Pokaran district in the Thar Desert also.

Habits
P. ventromaculatus is a fast active snake, which gives rise to one of its common names, glossy-bellied racer. It is normally seen in open country. When alarmed, it quickly retreats into cover. It hibernates in winter. It has been known to live as long as five years.

Diet
P. ventromaculatus largely preys upon lizards.

Reproduction
P. ventromaculatus is oviparous. Gravid females have been obtained in early summer. About 9 eggs are laid. They hatch around September.

Local names
Arabic – Dawaid-al-khail.
Urdu – Sagi.

References

Further reading
Daniel, J.C. (2002). The Book of Indian Reptiles and Amphibians. Mumbai: Bombay Natural History Society/Oxford University Press. 
Barabanov, Andrei (2003). "Taxonomic status of Coluber ventromaculatus bengalensis Khan et Khan, 2000 (Reptilia: Squamata: Colubridae)". Russian Journal of Herpetology 9 (3): 255. [2002]
Gray, J.E. (1834). Illustrations of Indian Zoology, Chiefly Selected from the Collection of Major-General Hardwicke. Vol. II. London. 263 pp. + Plates 1–102. (Coluber ventromaculatus, new species, Plate 80).
Günther, A. (1859). "On the geographical distribution of reptiles". Annals and Magazine of Natural History, Third Series 3: 221–237. (Zamenis ventrimaculatus, new combination, p. 223).
Schätti, B; Wilson, L.D. (1986). "Coluber Linnaeus. Holarctic racers". Catalogue of American Amphibians and Reptiles (399) : 1-4.
Schätti, B.; Monsch, P. (2004). "Systematics and phylogenetic relationships of Whip snakes (Hierophis Fitzinger and Zamenis andreana Werner 1917) (Reptilia: Squamata: Colubrinae)". Revue Suisse de Zoologie 111 (2): 239–256. (Platyceps ventromaculatus, new combination).
Smith, Malcolm A. (1943). The Fauna of British India, Ceylon and Burma, Including the Whole of the Indo-Chinese Sub-region. Reptilia and Amphibia. Vol. III—Serpentes. London: Secretary of State for India. (Taylor and Francis, printers). xii + 583 pp. (Coluber ventromaculatus, p. 168).
Whitaker, Romulus (2006). Common Indian Snakes: A Field Guide. Revised edition. New Delhi: MacMillan India Ltd.

External links

Colubrids
Snakes of Asia
Fauna of South Asia
Fauna of Western Asia
Reptiles of the Middle East
Reptiles of India
Reptiles of Pakistan
Reptiles described in 1834
Taxa named by John Edward Gray
Taxa named by Thomas Hardwicke
Endemic fauna of Saudi Arabia